Lion's Head or stewed meatball is a dish from the Huaiyang cuisine of eastern China, consisting of large pork meatballs stewed with vegetables. There are two varieties:  white (or plain), and red (红烧, cooked with soy sauce). The plain variety is usually stewed or steamed with napa cabbage. The red variety can be stewed with cabbage or cooked with bamboo shoots and tofu derivatives. The minced meat rich in fat is more likely to bring better texture, addition of chopped water chestnut also works.

The name "lion's head", derives from the shape of the meatball which is supposed to resemble the head of the Chinese guardian lion, specifically.

The dish originated in Yangzhou and Zhenjiang, to a lesser degree, Huai'an, while the plain variety is more common in Yangzhou and the red variety more common in Zhenjiang. The dish became a part of Shanghai cuisine with the influx of migrants in the 19th and early 20th century.

The dish can also be prepared with beef or be made as a vegetarian dish.

History 

The dish has been well known since the late Qing dynasty, as the recipe extracted from Xu Ke's Qing bai lei chao attests:獅子頭者，以形似而得名，豬肉圓也。豬肉肥瘦各半，細切粗斬，乃和以蛋白，使易凝固，或加蝦仁、蟹粉。以黃沙罐一，底置黃芽菜或竹筍，略和以水及鹽，以肉作極大之圓，置其上，上覆菜葉，以罐蓋蓋之，乃入鐵鍋，撒鹽少許，以防鍋裂，然後以文火乾燒之。每燒數柴把一停，約越五分時更燒之，候熟取出。 (Lion's head, is a pork meatball,  its shape just as its name implies. The proportion of fat to lean pork is fifty-fifty, chop up them, then mix them with egg whites so that the mixture can coagulate easily. The shrimp meat or crab powder is an optional ingredient to mix. Put napa cabbage or bamboo shoots on the bottom of a clay pot,  pour a little water and dissolve the salt in it. Make the meatballs as big as possible, put them in, then put leaves above the meatballs and put the lid on the pot. Place the pot in a wok filled with salt water, to avoid cracking in this way, cook over a gentle heat. stoke enough firewood at intervals, when the meat is medium, burn the wok fiercely until the meat is well done.)Earlier, a salt merchant from Yangzhou called Tong Yuejian who lived in the mid-Qing recorded a dish, dadian rouyuan, in his concise cookbook Tiaoding ji:取肋條肉去皮切細長條粗㓠，加豆粉少許作料，用手松捺不可搓，或油炸，或蒸，襯用嫩青。The significant resemblance between the both dished indicates that the latter may be the prototype of the former, which is acceptable. It is said to date back to Sui dynasty in myth and folklore, but there is no evidence to support such a theory so far.

Literature 
 Liang Shih-chiu's essay Lion's Head. Liang thought the dish is from Yangzhou cuisine, while its northern counterpart is Sixi wanzi, Braised Pork Balls in Gravy.
 Wang Zengqi's essay Roushizhe bubi. Wang classified the dish as Huai'an cuisine. He wrote that Lion's head is "fluffy but not loose", and "that is the difference from Sixi wanzi". Besides, Wang mentioned that Zhou Enlai could cook this dish since he hailed from Huai'an.

Types

Stewed meatballs with crab powder 
This type is deemed to be the traditional one, its ingredients and procedure changed a little from the dish mentioned above. 
 Ribs of Pork (proportion of fat and lean pork: 7:3)
 Crab Roe
 Crab Meat
 Napa Cabbage
 Shrimp
 Shaoxing Wine
 Salt
 Infusion of garlic and scallions
 Starch
 Pork Stock
 Lard

See also

 Pork ball
 Beef ball
 Steamed meatball
 Meatball
 Fish ball
 List of cabbage dishes
 List of pork dishes

References

External links
 Lion's Head Soup recipe

Meatballs
Shanghai cuisine
Pork dishes
Cabbage dishes